This page provides information of the qualification process of the 1988 AFC U-16 Championship.

Groups

Group 1
The group matches were played in Kuwait in August, 1988. However, match results were not fully available from online. The final positions are shown below.

Group 2

 and  qualified for the final tournament.

Group 3

Group 4

Group 5

External links
RSSSF

1988 AFC U-16 Championship
AFC U-16 Championship qualification